Amadís de Gaula (in English Amadis of Gaul);) is an Iberian landmark work among the Portuguese and Spanish chivalric romances which were in vogue in sixteenth-century, although its first version, much revised before printing, was written at the onset of the 14th century in an uncertain place of the Iberian Peninsula.

The earliest surviving edition of the known text, by Garci Rodríguez de Montalvo (not Ordóñez de Montalvo), was printed in Zaragoza, Spain, in 1508, although almost certainly there were earlier printed editions, now lost. It was published in four books in Castilian, but its origins are unclear: The narrative originates in the late post-Arthurian genre and had certainly been read as early as the 14th century by the chancellor Pero López de Ayala, as well as his contemporary Pero Ferrús.

Montalvo himself confesses to have amended the first three volumes, and to be the author of the fourth. Additionally, in the Portuguese Chronicle by Gomes Eanes de Zurara (1454), Amadis is attributed to Vasco de Lobeira, who was knighted after the Battle of Aljubarrota (1385). Other sources claim that the work was, in fact, a copy of João de Lobeira, and that it was a translation into Castilian Spanish of an earlier work, probably from the beginning of the 14th century, however, no primitive version in Portuguese is known. A more recent sources attribute Amadis to Henry of Castile, due to evidence linking his biography with the events in Amadis. The inspiration for the "Amadis de Gaula" appears to be the forbidden marriage of Infanta Constanza of Aragon with Henry in 1260 (see Don Juan Manuel's  of 1335), as forbidden as was also Oriana's marriage to Amadis. 

In the introduction to the text, Garci Rodríguez de Montalvo explains that he edited the first three books of a text in circulation since the 14th century. Montalvo also admits to adding a fourth as yet unpublished book as well as adding a continuation, Las sergas de Esplandián, which he claims was found in a buried chest in Constantinople and transported to Spain by a Hungarian merchant (the famous motif of the found manuscript).

Amadís de Gaula was the fictional character Don Quixote's favorite book in the novel by Miguel de Cervantes.

Characters and plot
The story narrates the star-crossed love of King Perión of Gaula and Elisena of England, resulting in the secret birth of Amadís. The place called Gaula is a fictional kingdom within Brittany. It has in the past been identified with Wales or France, but it is best understood as a completely legendary place.

Abandoned at birth on a raft in England, the child is raised by the knight Gandales in Scotland and investigates his origins through fantastic adventures.

He is persecuted by the wizard Arcaláus, but protected by Urganda la Desconocida (Urganda the Unknown or Unrecognized), an ambiguous priestess with magical powers and a talent for prophecy. Knighted by his father King Perión, Amadís overcomes the challenges of the enchanted Ínsola Firme (a sort of peninsula), including passing through the Arch of Faithful Lovers.

Despite Amadís' celebrated fidelity, his childhood sweetheart, Oriana, heiress to the throne of Great Britain, becomes jealous of a rival princess and sends a letter to chastise Amadís. The knight changes his name to Beltenebros and indulges in a long period of madness on the isolated Peña Pobre (Poor Peak or Mountain).

He recovers his senses only when Oriana sends her maid to retrieve him. He then helps Oriana's father, Lisuarte, repel invaders. A short time later he and Oriana scandalously consummate their love. Their son Esplandián is the result of this one illicit meeting.

Rodríguez de Montalvo asserts that in the "original" Amadís, Esplandián eventually kills his father for this offense against his mother's honor; however, Montalvo amends this defect and resolves their conflict peaceably.

Oriana and Amadís defer their marriage for many years due to enmity between Amadís and Oriana's father, Lisuarte. Amadís absents himself from Britain for at least 10 years, masquerading as "The Knight of the Green Sword". He travels as far as Constantinople and secures the favor of the child-princess Leonorina, who will become Esplandián's wife. His most famous adventure during this time of exile is the battle with the giant Endriago, a monster born of incest who exhales a poisonous gas and whose body is covered in scales.

As a knight, Amadís is courteous, gentle, sensitive, and a Christian, who dares to defend free love. Unlike most literary heroes of his time (French and German, for example), Amadís is a handsome man who would cry if refused by his lady, but is invincible in battle and usually emerges drenched in his own and his opponents' blood.

Literary significance
Called also Amadís sin tiempo (Amadis without Time) by his mother (in allusion to the fact that being conceived outside marriage she would have to abandon him and he would probably die), he is the most representative Iberian hero of chivalric romance. His adventures ran to four volumes, probably the most popular such tales of their time. François de la Noue, one of the Huguenot captains of the 16th century, affirmed that reading the romances of Amadis had caused a "spirit of vertigo" even in his more rationally-minded generation. The books show a complete idealization and simplification of knight-errantry. Even servants are hardly heard of, but there are many princesses, ladies and kings. Knights and damsels in distress are found everywhere. The book's style is reasonably modern, but lacks dialogue and the character's impressions, mostly describing the action.

The book's style was praised by the usually demanding Juan de Valdés, although he considered that from time to time it was too low or too high a style. The language is characterized by a certain "Latinizing" influence in its syntax, especially the tendency to place the verb at the end of the sentence; as well as other such details, such as the use of the present participle, which bring Amadís into line with the allegorical style of the 15th century.

Nevertheless, there is a breach of style when Garci Rodriguez de Montalvo presents the fourth book. It becomes dull and solemn, reflecting the nature of the intruding writer. The first three books are inspired in deeds and feats by knights-errant, dating back to the 13th century, while the fourth book emerges as a less brilliant attachment of the 15th century. The pristine style of Amadís can be perceived in the few original famous pages analyzed by Antonio Rodríguez Moñino: It is lively and straight to the facts of war and love, with brief dialogs, all quite elegant and amusing. Amadís of Gaula is frequently referenced in the humorous classic Don Quixote, written by Miguel de Cervantes in the early 17th century. The character Don Quixote idolizes Amadís and tries to imitate him.

Historically, Amadís was very influential amongst the Spanish conquistadores. Bernal Díaz del Castillo mentioned the wonders of Amadís when he marveled at his first sight of Tenochtitlan (modern Mexico City) – and such place names as California come directly from the work.

The English literary historian Helen Moore in her 2020 book Amadis in English: A Study in the Reading of Romance suggested the book has been popular over the centuries because:

The British writer C.S. Lewis said that Amadis was among his "own favourite reading" and that he had an "early & lasting love of Oriana."

Origins
As mentioned above, the origins of the book of Amadís are disputed.

The existing texts

The version of Montalvo
The only known complete text of Amadís de Gaula is that of Garci Rodríguez de Montalvo, a Castilian writer. The earliest surviving text (book) is from 1508, although scholars accept that there were earlier editions.

If this text had been based on a Portuguese original, there would be linguistic evidence in the text. As there is none, the text of Montalvo must have been written in Castilian.

Manuscript fragments
He claimed sole ownership of only Book IV. The existence of a prior version of Books I to III has been supported by Antonio Rodríguez Moñino's identification of four 15th-century manuscript fragments (ca. 1420). The name "Esplandián" is clearly visible in one of these. The fragments belong to the collection of the Bancroft Library at the University of California, Berkeley. They show that, contrary to the usual view that Montalvo expanded the first three books, instead he abbreviated them.

Earlier mentions of Amadis
In the Spanish translation of Egidio Colonna's De regimine principum, Amadís is mentioned and also the poet Enrico, who could well be Enrico de Castiglia. Egidio Colonna was in Rome in 1267 when Henry of Castile was elected Senator. The translation was made around 1350 under King Peter the Cruel. This is the oldest mention of Amadís.

Sequels in Spanish
Amadis of Gauls popularity was such that in the decades following its publication, dozens of sequels of sometimes minor quality were published in Spanish, Italian, and German, together with a number of other imitative works. Montalvo himself cashed in with the continuation Las sergas de Esplandián (Book V), and the sequel-specialist Feliciano de Silva (also the author of Second Celestina) added four more books including Amadis of Greece (Book IX). Miguel de Cervantes wrote Don Quixote as a burlesque attack on the resulting genre. Cervantes and his protagonist Quixote, however, keep the original Amadís in very high esteem.

The Spanish volumes, with their authors and the names of their main characters:

 Books I–IV: <1508 (Garci Rodríguez de Montalvo): Amadís de Gaula
 Book V: 1510 (Garci Rodríguez de Montalvo): Esplandián
 Book VI: 1510 (Páez de Ribera) – this volume was universally maligned
 Book VII: 1514 (Feliciano de Silva): Lisuarte de Grecia
 Book VIII: 1526 (Juan Díaz) – Diaz had Amadis die in this volume which was much criticized
 Book IX: 1530 (Feliciano de Silva): Amadís de Grecia (Amadis of Greece)
 Book X: 1532 (Feliciano de Silva): Florisel de Niquea
 Book XI: 1535 & 1551 (Feliciano de Silva): Rogel de Grecia
 Book XII: 1546 (Pedro de Luján): Silves de la Selva

Translations, continuations and sequels in Castilian and other languages
Castilian sequels:
  – original anonymous text in Castilian: 1511
  (son of Palmerin de Olivia) – original anonymous text in Castilian: 1512

In Germany and England, Amadís was known chiefly through its French translations, sometimes much revised, and in England the cycle was generally referred to by its French title Amadis de Gaule. The French translations did not follow the Spanish book divisions exactly, and the entire cycle in the French version extends to 24 books. Note that the book numbers of the French translation do not always correspond to the book numbers of the Spanish originals, and in both languages, "book" is not the same as "printed volume"; physical printed books sometimes contained more than one "book" of the series.

French translations, with their translators:
 Book I: 1540 (Nicolas de Herberay des Essarts)
 Book II: 1541 (Nicolas de Herberay des Essarts)
 Book III: 1542 (Nicolas de Herberay des Essarts)
 Book IV: 1543 (Nicolas de Herberay des Essarts)
 Book V: 1544 (Nicolas de Herberay des Essarts)
 (Spanish book VI was rejected as apocryphal)
 Book VI: 1545 (Nicolas de Herberay des Essarts) (actually Spanish Book VII)
 (Spanish Book VIII was rejected because it told of the death of Amadis)
 Book VII: 1546 (Nicolas de Herberay des Essarts) (actually Spanish Book IXa)
 Book VIII: 1548 (Nicolas de Herberay des Essarts) (actually Spanish Book IXb)
 Book IX: 1551 (Giles Boileau & Claude Colet) (actually Spanish Book Xa)
 Book X: 1552 (Jacques Gohory) (actually Spanish Book Xb)
 Book XI: 1554 (Jacques Gohory) (actually Spanish Book XIa)
 Book XII: 1556 (Guillaume Aubert) (actually Spanish Book XIb)
 Book XIII: 1571 (Jacques Gohory) (actually Spanish Book XIIa)
 Book XIV: 1574 (Antoine Tyron) (actually Spanish Book XIIb)
 Books XV–XXI: 1576–1581
 Books XXII–XXIV: after 1594

The German Continuation:
 Books XIX–XXI : 1594–5

The Italian Continuation:
 Books XIII–XVIII (Mambrino Roseo da Fabriano)

In Portugal, the Amadis cycle also launched other adventure series, such as:
  (Palmeirim of England) – original Portuguese text by Francisco de Morais Cabral: c.1544 (published 1567)
  – original Portuguese text by Diogo Fernandes
  – original Portuguese text by Gonçalves Lobato
  (Chronicle of Emperor Clarimund) – original Portuguese text by João de Barros
  – original Portuguese text by Gonçalo Fernandes Trancoso

Operas
Amadis (1684) by Jean-Baptiste Lully
Amadis de Grèce (1699) by André Cardinal Destouches
Amadigi di Gaula (1715) by George Frideric Handel
Amadis de Gaule (1771) by Jean-Benjamin de La Borde and Pierre Montan Berton
Amadis de Gaule (1779) by Johann Christian Bach
Amadis (1922) by Jules Massenet

References

External links

 Full text in Spanish
 Amadis de Gaula – images of a 1526 edition of the original Spanish text
 The ancient, famous and honourable history of Amadis de Gaule. [books 1 and 2] - Early English Books Online
 Vasco Lobeira: Amadis de Gaul, Book I, translated by Robert Southey, who erroneously says the author's name was Garciordonez de Montalvo.
 Volumes 2-4 in English.  The Gutenberg Project
  – Italian libretto by Nicola Francesco Haym for the opera by Handel
 

14th-century books
1508 books
Arthurian literature
Renaissance literature
Series of books
Spanish novels
Characters in Spanish novels
Romance (genre)
Spanish fantasy novels
Novels set in England
Don Quixote
Etymology of California